Nam Sun-ok (born 16 February 1969) is a South Korean volleyball player. She competed in the women's tournament at the 1988 Summer Olympics.

References

1969 births
Living people
South Korean women's volleyball players
Olympic volleyball players of South Korea
Volleyball players at the 1988 Summer Olympics
Place of birth missing (living people)
Asian Games medalists in volleyball
Volleyball players at the 1990 Asian Games
Medalists at the 1990 Asian Games
Asian Games silver medalists for South Korea